Kim Jin-suk (born 28 January 1969) is a South Korean freestyle swimmer. She competed in two events at the 1984 Summer Olympics. She attended Ewha Womans University.

References

External links
 

1969 births
Living people
South Korean female freestyle swimmers
Olympic swimmers of South Korea
Swimmers at the 1984 Summer Olympics
Place of birth missing (living people)
Ewha Womans University alumni
Asian Games medalists in swimming
Asian Games bronze medalists for South Korea
Swimmers at the 1986 Asian Games
Medalists at the 1986 Asian Games
20th-century South Korean women